Robin Fox (born 1934) is an Anglo-American anthropologist who has written on the topics of incest avoidance, marriage systems, human and primate kinship systems, evolutionary anthropology, sociology and the history of ideas in the social sciences. He founded the department of anthropology at Rutgers University in 1967 and had remained a professor there for the rest of his career, also being a director of research for the H. F. Guggenheim Foundation from 1972 to 1984.

Fox published The Imperial Animal, with Lionel Tiger in 1971 one of the earliest to advocate and demonstrate an evolutionary approach to the understanding of human social behaviour. His daughter Kate Fox wrote the book Watching the English.

In 2013 Fox was elected to the US National Academy of Sciences (Anthropology and Evolutionary Biology).

Life and work

Robin Fox was born in the village of Haworth  in the Yorkshire Dales, at the nadir of the Great Depression in 1934. He had very little schooling during the Second World War, moving all over England with his soldier father (ex-Indian Army), and his mother, then an army nursing aide. After a narrow escape from death by bombing, he pursued his early education through the Army, the Church of England, public libraries, and the BBC, more than through formal schooling. Then through a series of scholarships—one of them to the grammar school in Thornton, West Yorkshire, he made his way to the London School of Economics in 1953 and gained a first degree in Sociology with First Class Honours. This included Philosophy and Social Anthropology, with much influence from Karl Popper, Ernest Gellner, and Raymond Firth—and occasional interaction with Bertrand Russell.

He went to Harvard for graduate work in the Department of Social Relations where he found himself under the tutelage of Clyde Kluckhohn, Evon Vogt, Paul Friedrich and Dell Hymes, in New Mexico, where he studied language and society among the Pueblo Indians. He concentrated on the Pueblo of Cochiti, on the Rio Grande, on which he wrote his PhD thesis (submitted to the University of London and examined by Raymond Firth, Edmund Leach and Daryll Ford). A revised version of the thesis with his analysis of the evolution of Pueblo kinship systems and the "Crow-Omaha" question, was published as The Keresan Bridge: A Problem in Pueblo Ethnology, 1967. This logico-conjectural attempt to reconstruct the history of kinship terms was completely against the grain of Functionalist orthodoxy in England at the time, and equally critical of the prevailing American theories of acculturation.

He returned to England, where he taught for four years in the department of sociology at the University of Exeter, starting fieldwork on Tory Island, a remote Gaelic-speaking community off the coast of County Donegal in Ireland (his mother's family, also called Fox, came from Ireland.) He wrote his first museum-series publication Kinship and Land Tenure on Tory Island (1966.) His work on the island eventually resulted in a book The Tory Islanders: A People of the Celtic Fringe (1978), for which the University of Ulster awarded him a doctor of science (D.Sc.) degree. He then returned to the LSE for four more years, lecturing mainly on kinship, and producing, Kinship and Marriage: An Anthropological Perspective, in 1967.

Fox had published "Sibling incest" in the British Journal of Sociology (1962), in which he revived the neglected theories of Edward Westermarck, coining the term "Westermarck Effect". Under the influence of such figures as John Bowlby, David Attenborough (who was his student for a while), Robert Ardrey, Niko Tinbergen, Desmond Morris, Michael Chance and Lionel Tiger, he became interested in ethology. He gave the first primate behaviour and human evolution lectures in the department, co-teaching with the primatological anatomist John Napier from the Royal Free Hospital School of Medicine. He and Tiger wrote a paper on "The Zoological Perspective in Social Science" (1966). He added to it with his Malinowski Memorial Lecture of 1967 on "Aspects of Hominid Behavioral Evolution." 

Rutgers University offered him a chair of anthropology in 1967, and the chance to start a new department, including Tiger. In 2009 its two-degree programs, evolutionary anthropology and cultural anthropology, were ranked in the top ten in the country. He and Tiger completed their joint work, The Imperial Animal, in 1970, a book that contributed to nature/nurture debate of the next few decades. He spent an academic year at Stanford University School of Medicine (Department of Psychiatry) as an NIMH fellow, studying behavioural biology and the brain with David Hamburg and Karl Pribram.

In 1972, the Harry Frank Guggenheim Foundation, through its president Mason Gross, ex-president of Rutgers, made Tiger and Fox joint Research Directors and started a program of support for work particularly on violence and dominance. The list of their grantees is a Who's Who in the early development of bio-social science and of what came to be known as sociobiology. They worked for twelve years with the Foundation, and during that time he did original research with Dieter Steklis among macaque monkeys on an island off Bermuda and vervet monkeys on St. Kitts. He produced several books including Encounter with Anthropology (1973) Biosocial Anthropology (editor and contributor, 1975), The Red Lamp of Incest (1980) and Neonate Cognition (1984, edited with Jacques Mehler of CNRS, Paris).

During this same period he was a visiting professor at Oxford, Paris (Ecole des Hautes Etudes en Sciences Sociales), the University of California, San Diego, and the Universidad de los Andes in Bogotá, Colombia, where he did a "participant observer" stint as a bullfighter, studying the provincial bullfight culture of southern Colombia. In 1985 Rutgers made him a University Professor, the highest honour it can give a faculty member.  He wrote The Search for Society (1989) his "equal time response" to the interpretive anthropology of Clifford Geertz, and The Violent Imagination (1989), a book of essays, verse, satire, drama, and dialogue.

Fox was then a Senior Overseas Scholar at St John's College, Cambridge, and wrote a series of related collections of his essays. The first was Reproduction and Succession (1993), relating his part in both the appeal of a Mormon policeman to the Supreme Court and the famous "Baby M" surrogate mother trials in New Jersey. Then followed The Challenge of Anthropology (1994), and Conjectures and Confrontations (1997). In 2000 he added significantly to the material in The Violent Imagination, plus a foreword by Ashley Montagu, which came out as The Passionate Mind. He has published a number of controversial papers on contemporary affairs in The National Interest – nationalism, the nature of war, the Northern Ireland problem, democracy in Iraq, the "end of history" – and a series of brisk exchanges on human rights, mostly with Francis Fukuyama and Amnesty International. He wrote an autobiography of the first forty years of his life as Participant Observer: Memoir of a Transatlantic Life (2004.)

Since then Fox has written further books on the tribal basis of behavior, civilization and the savage mind, and the Shakespeare authorship question (Shakespeare's Education: Schools, Lawsuits and Theater in the Tudor Miracle (2012). In 2013 he was elected to the US National Academy of Sciences (Anthropology and Evolutionary Biology). In 2014 a festschrift for him was published by Transaction Publishers and edited by Michael Egan titled The Character of Human Institutions: Robin Fox and the Rise of Biosocial Science with seventeen contributions.

He is married to Lin Fox (Ed.D. Columbia) who taught Health Sciences at Kean University, New Jersey; they live on a small farm outside Princeton, New Jersey. He continues to teach (American Indians, Origin and Fall of Civilizations, Comparative and Persistent Mythology, Incest in Literature) and to pursue research on the archaeology of the Calusa Indians of SW Florida, and the evolutionary relationship between consanguineous marriage and fertility.

Books

(with Lionel Tiger)

References

External links
 Website

1934 births
Living people
British anthropologists
People from Haworth
Alumni of the London School of Economics
Rutgers University faculty
20th-century English writers
21st-century English writers
Members of the United States National Academy of Sciences